Naked Under Capricorn is a 1989 Australian mini series about a young man lost in the Australian desert.

Cast

 Nigel Havers - Davy Marriner
 Noni Hazlehurst - Monica Marriner
 David Gulpilil - Activity
 John Jarratt - Bluey Dallas
 John Stanton - Edrington
 Alfred Bell - Mission Mo
 Kym Van-Iersel - Trubbity
 Penny Cook - Peggy Delaney
 Mark Lee - Tim Roberts
 Kylie Belling - Casey
 Charles Tingwell - Wilson

References

External links
Naked Under Capricorn at IMDb
Naked Under Capricorn at AustLit

1980s Australian television miniseries
1989 Australian television series debuts
1989 Australian television series endings
Nine Network original programming
English-language television shows